Tachibana Dam  is a gravity dam located in Miyazaki Prefecture in Japan. The dam is used for flood control and power production. The catchment area of the dam is 70.5 km2. The dam impounds about 29  ha of land when full and can store 10000 thousand cubic meters of water. The construction of the dam was started on 1957 and completed in 1963.

See also
List of dams in Japan

References

Dams in Miyazaki Prefecture